Yaruha is an urban-type settlement in southern Ukraine located near the Dniester River, and thus the border with Moldova. It is also sometimes known as Jaruga.

It was the site of engagement in the Polish–Soviet War.

References

Shtetls
Urban-type settlements in Mohyliv-Podilskyi Raion